The Pediatric Infectious Disease Journal is a monthly peer-reviewed medical journal covering research pertaining to infectious diseases in children. It was established in 1982 as a bimonthly journal under the name Pediatric Infectious Disease, obtaining its current name in 1987. It is published by Lippincott Williams & Wilkins and the editors-in-chief are John D. Nelson and George H. McCracken Jr. (University of Texas Southwestern Medical Center).

Abstracting and indexing
The journal is abstracted and indexed in:
BIOSIS 
MEDLINE/PUBMED 
EMBASE 
SCOPUS 
Science Citation Index Expanded 
Current Contents/Clinical Medicine
According to the Journal Citation Reports, the journal has a 2014 impact factor of 2.723.

References

External links

Pediatrics journals
Microbiology journals
Publications established in 1982
Monthly journals
Lippincott Williams & Wilkins academic journals
English-language journals